Risk is the second album by Christian rock band Ten Shekel Shirt. It was released in 2003.

Track listing
"Risk"
"Cheer Up"
"This Story"
"Beauty"
"February"
"Always Known To You"
"Poorest King"
"Over the Room"
"Safest Place"
"Today"

2003 albums
Ten Shekel Shirt albums